The Nokia C1 is an Android Go budget smartphone with 3G network speed, announced on December 11, 2019 by Nokia brand licensee HMD Global.

Specifications

Two cameras and two flashes
The smartphone has two, front and rear, 5 megapixel (MP) cameras. Nokia C1 has also two, front and rear, flashes.

Display
The smartphone has 5.4" (5.4 inches) display.

Battery, radio and storage
The smartphone has 2,500 milliampere hour (mAh) removable battery,  3.5 mm audio jack, FM radio, 16 Gigabit (GB) of storage, and a microSD memory card slot.

Operating system
Nokia C1 has Android 9 Pie (Go Edition) operating system with random-access memory (RAM) 1 GB and Quad Core 1.3 Gigahertz (GHz) processor as CPU.

Advertisement
Advertisement slogan for the Nokia C1 was "Level Up", as Nokia explaining, the smartphone was brilliant for getting selfies with the second front camera, as well as getting video calls, and watching  YouTube with bigger, 5.4" display. As HMD Global spokesman Juho Sarvikas said, "Millions of consumers across markets in Africa, Middle East and APAC will upgrade from a feature phone to their first smartphone. Nokia C1 is a smartphone they can trust — bringing quality experiences at an affordable price with 3G connectivity."

Successor
Nokia has launched the successor to the Nokia C1 smartphone with the name Nokia C1 Plus in 2020 which comes with Android 10 Go Edition and has other upgraded specifications including a 5.45-inch HD+ 18:9 in-cell display (1520 x 720 pixels), a 1.4 GHz quad-core processor, 1GB of LPDDR3 RAM, 16GB storage, McroSD card expandable storage up to 128GB, single / Dual SIM variants, a 5-megapixel rear camera with LED flash, a 5-megapixel front camera with LED flash, a 2500mAh removable battery and supports 4G VoLTE, Wi-Fi 802.11 b/g/n, Bluetooth 4.2, GPS, micro USB and 3.5mm headphone jack connectivity options. It measures 149.1 × 71.2 × 8.75mm and weighs 146 grams.

References

C1
Mobile phones introduced in 2019
Mobile phones with user-replaceable battery
Discontinued smartphones